Al Batinah South Governorate ( Muḥāfaẓat Ǧanūb al-Bāṭinah) is a governorate of Oman. It was created on 28 October 2011 when Al Batinah Region was split into Al Batinah North Governorate and Al Batinah South Governorate. The centre of the governorate is the wilayat of Rustaq.

Provinces
Al Batinah South Governorate consists of six provinces (wilayat):
Rustaq
Al Awabi
Nakhal
Wadi Al Maawil
Barka
Al-Musannah

Demographics

References

 
Governorates of Oman